Tadeusz Skowroński (born 2 October 1921 - 11 April 1988) was a former Polish footballer who played as a forward. During his career he played for Warta Poznań, Śmigły Wilno, Lechia Gdańsk and Arkonia Szczecin.

Biography

Born in Poznań Skowroński played for local side Warta Poznań advancing through the youth sides before leaving for Śmigły Wilno in 1938. In his second season with Śmigły the outbreak of World War II with the Invasion of Poland put Skowroński's career on hold until 1945. Śmigły Wilno was dissolved in 1939, with Vilnius also becoming a Lithuanian city after the war ended. This led Skowroński to join newly created Lechia Gdańsk in 1946. Skowroński was an important player in Lechia's early history, helping the team to win their district league twice, one of them winning promotion to the I liga (modern day Ekstraklasa) and being part of the first Lechia team to play in Poland's top division in 1949. In his first season of top flight football he played 15 games scoring 4 goals. After the 1949 season Skowroński left Lechia after the team finished bottom and got relegated. For the 1950 season he moved to Arkonia Szczecin helping the team to win the II liga (group 2) title, and promotion to the I liga. In the top division with Arkonia he played 5 goals scoring 1, being unable to help the side from finishing bottom and being relegated. The 1951 season is the last documented season of Skowroński's career leading to the possibility that he retired after the season at the age of 30 and it is unknown what he did after his footballing career. Skowroński died on 11 April 1988 in Warsaw aged 66.

Honours

Lechia Gdańsk
II liga (group 3): 1947
II liga (group 5): 1948

Arkonia Szczecin
II liga (western group): 1950

References

1921 births
1988 deaths
Warta Poznań players
Śmigły Wilno players
Lechia Gdańsk players
Arkonia Szczecin players
Polish footballers
Footballers from Poznań
Association football forwards